Self-policing is another term for self-governance, a group or community autonomously managing their own affairs.

Self-policing may also refer to:
Emotional self-regulation
Industry self-regulation
Self-control, in sociology / psychology
Self-regulatory organizations, in business and finance